"Cheer Up! The Summer" (styled "CHEER UP! THE SUMMER") is a single by Japanese recording artist Tatsuro Yamashita. It was released on September 14, 2016. It reached the eighth place on the Oricon Weekly Singles Chart on its release, selling 9,846 copies. It was also placed tenth on the Billboard Japan Hot 100.

Track listing

Weekly charts

References

2016 singles
2016 songs
Japanese-language songs
Song articles with missing songwriters